Carland Cross is a location in Cornwall, England, United Kingdom, about six miles (10 kilometres) north of Truro at OS grid reference . At Carland Cross there are a hamlet, a road junction and a large wind farm. The road junction is in the civil parish of St Erme, very close to the boundary with St Newlyn East.

Road junction
Immediately north of the settlement, Carland Cross traffic roundabout is the junction of the A39 and the A30 trunk road. To the east of the roundabout, the A30 is a dual carriageway road: to the west the A30 is single carriageway and to the south the A39 is also single carriageway. There is a motorists' services area, including a filling station, by the roundabout.

Proposals to create a new dual carriageway between Chiverton Cross and Carland Cross will see a transformation of the Carland Cross roundabout with the existing roundabout retained, but connected to an additional roundabout to the north forming a dumbbell style grade-separated junction with the A30 realigned.

Highways England's proposals for the Chiverton to Carland Cross improvement scheme were accepted for formal examination by the Planning Inspectorate in September 2018. Work started in 2021, projected to last at least until 2023, with the overall scheme costing £330 million.

Wind farm

Carland Cross wind farm is to the north of the A30 with road access from the roundabout. It is the second oldest windfarm in the UK after Delabole, and was built in 1992. It originally had 15 turbines manufactured by Vestas each with a capacity of 400kW. Plans by the Spanish-owned operator, Scottish Power, to upgrade and expand the wind farm to 20MW were opposed by a local pressure group called RATS (Residents Against Turbines). However, the repowering was approved in May 2012 and the new windfarm was officially opened in October 2013 with the 10 new Gamesa turbines having a capacity of 2MW each.

Antiquities
Nearby there are Iron Age burial mounds and flint arrow heads have been found in local fields.

References

External links

Villages in Cornwall
Wind farms in England
Power stations in South West England